Scientific rigging is a term referring to a number of malpractices used by political parties to win elections in West Bengal state in India. These malpractices may include booth capturing, party cadres impersonating genuine voters, polling agents beaten up threatening voters not to vote for the opposition, etc. These malpractices are generally achieved through blatant use of government power and organization of political parties. The term was used by the opposition to the Left Front government in West Bengal.

To prevent scientific rigging the Election Commission of India takes various extremely stringent norms, including a number of check lists, additional visits by officials and even scrutinizing the training of block-level officers.

See also 

 Booth capturing
Electoral fraud

References 

Political corruption in India
Corruption in West Bengal
Electoral fraud in India
Elections in West Bengal